Barış Arduç (born 9 October 1987) is a Turkish actor and model.

Early life 

Barış Arduç was born in 1987 in Scherzingen, Switzerland, the middle child of real estate agent couple Gülay and Erol Arduç. He descends from Ordu on his father's side and from Artvin on his mother's side. He's family is of partial Albanian descent. He has three siblings with his older brother Onur Arduç and brother Mert Arduç. Arduç, who finally returned to Turkey with his family from abroad at the age of 8, finished primary school in Sakarya and Gölcük. Due to the earthquake in Gölcük on August 17, 1999, he stayed with his family in Bolu. He had to move. After graduating from middle and high school in Bolu, he came to Istanbul with his family in the second year of high school and completed his secondary education here.

Career

2011–2014: Benim İçin Üzülme, Bugünün Saraylısı and cinema movies 

Arduç first got supporting roles in 2011 in the series Küçük Hanımefendi, Dinle Sevgili, and Pis Yedili. Later in 2012, he portrayed the character of Ahmet Avcıoğlu in ATV's series Benim İçin Üzülme which was written and directed by Mahsun Kırmızıgül and shot in Hopa, Artvin. Arduç's character, a young person who is a sports enthusiast and wants to play soccer in Trabzonspor, only appeared on the first episode and then in the flashbacks in the remaining episodes, but the character was so liked that after his death in the series a 10-meter banner was put on Trabzonspor's tribunes in his memory.

Later in 2013, he joined the cast of Bugünün Saraylısı from its 5th episode, a series based on the work of Refik Halid Karay and directed by Kudret Sabancı. For two seasons, he portrayed the character of businessman Selim Bayraktar, who manages the assets and companies of a young girl named Ayşen Kaya, the sole survivor of a group of companies and played by Cansu Tosun. The first season of Bugünün Saraylısı finished with 31 episodes, and its second season ended after 5 episodes due to low ratings.

Barış Arduç had his first cinematic debut in Hakan Yonat's 2014 movie Sadece Sen in which he played the character Emin on the last scene.

In November 2014, the movie Deliha was directed by Hakan Algül, and Arduç played the role of Şirinceli Cemil, a handsome photographer.

2015–2018: Racon: Ailem İçin, Kiralık Aşk and Mutluluk Zamani 

Arduç had his first leading role in January 2015 alongside Mehmet Aslantuğ, Hande Doğandemir, and Tomris İncer in ATV's series Racon: Ailem İçin in which he portrayed Tekin Atan, the adopted son and confidant of Mehmet Aslantuğ's character Kenan Korhan. Due to low ratings, the series finished after 4 episodes.

In June 2015, Arduç was cast in a leading role opposite Elçin Sangu in Star TV Romantic Comedy series Kiralık Aşk, which was directed by Metin Balekoğlu, Barış Yöş and Şenol Sönmez and written by Meriç Acemi. Arduç, who portrayed a young and renowned successful shoe designer and business man named Ömer İplikçi, earned a great fan base in the Middle East and won many awards.
Kiralık Aşk which started airing in the summer months, quickly became one of the most popular series and achieved tremendous success within social media. The series's teasers on YouTube have millions of views.

Barış Arduç became the advertising face of Derimod company in 2015. The advertisement clip which showed Arduç with 6 different women in a casino, was directed by Ömer Faruk Sorak, prepared by Alametifarika, and produced by Böcek Productions. Nihat Odabaşı took the photograph for the advertisement campaign which was launched under the slogan "Derimod on my feet". The advertising campaign took its place on television, billboards, internet sites and magazines in October 2015.

In November 2017, Arduç was cast in a leading role opposite Elçin Sangu in the romantic comedy movie Time of Happiness / Mutluluk Zamanı, which was directed by Şenol Sönmez.

2019–present: Kuzgun, Çukur, Kulüp and Alparslan: Büyük Selçuklu 

In February 2019, Arduç was cast in a leading role in Star TV drama series Kuzgun as the titular character Kuzgun which is directed by Bahadır İnce. He portrayed the story of a man that returned for revenge after being away for 20 years. On 12 March 2020, it was confirmed that Arduç had been cast in Show TV's drama series Çukur, starring Aras Bulut İynemli. Joining the series in its 3rd season, Arduç played the role of Arik Boke Erdenet, the younger brother of the main character's enemy.

Barış Arduç portrayed Fıstık İsmail in the Netflix series, Kulüp (The Club) in 2021. In July 2021, Akli Film, the producer of Uyanış: Büyük Selçuklu, announced that Barış Arduç is involved in the second season of Uyanış: Büyük Selçuklu that is based on lives of Seljuk sultans. Arduç portrays the leading role of Alp Arslan in Alparslan: Büyük Selçuklu.

Filmography

Discography

References

1987 births
Turkish people of Albanian descent
Swiss people of Albanian descent
People from Bern
21st-century Turkish male actors
Turkish male models
Male actors from Istanbul
Turkish male television actors
Turkish male film actors
Living people